Szwejkówko  is a village in the administrative district of Gmina Orzysz, within Pisz County, Warmian-Masurian Voivodeship, in northern Poland. The village has a population of 180. Historians estimate the village was founded in the early 12th century.

References

Villages in Pisz County